Macrerpeton is a genus of edopoid temnospondyl within the family Cochleosauridae. It contains a single species, Macrerpeton huxleyi. It was discovered in the fossil-rich Allegheny Formation of Linton, Ohio.

References

Cochleosauridae